This is a list of bordering countries with the greatest relative differences in GDP (PPP) per person; specifically those pairs of neighbouring countries where the richer country is at least twice as wealthy on a per capita basis than the poorer. These statistics however do not consider differences in other economic indicators that measure welfare, such as their human development index, or inequality within countries.

Characteristics 
The greatest cases of inequity typically would involve an impoverished and politically unstable country neighbouring a resource-rich and relatively stable one, although neither may be recognised as a high-income economy. As an extreme example, the GDP per capita for Saudi Arabia, is over 42 times greater to that of its neighbour Yemen. In the four biggest ratios, the poorer country is either Yemen or North Korea.

Due to lack of economic data, the Vatican City (which is surrounded by Italy), Saint Martin (which shares the island of Saint Martin with Sint Maarten) and the British Overseas Territories of Akrotiri and Dhekelia located in the island of Cyprus, are not included in this list.

See also
 List of countries and territories by land borders
 List of countries by GDP (PPP) per capita

References

Lists of countries by GDP per capita
GDP (PPP) per capita
Inequality
Economy-related lists of superlatives